Dossier Verhulst was a Dutch drama from 1986. The first episode was broadcast on 7 November 1986 on TROS. The series has been released on DVD.

Episodes
De Beëdiging
Het incident
De Echtscheiding
De kostschool
De verzoening
De verleiding begint
Het moment van de waarheid
De koude Douche
De confrontatie
De aanslag
De vergelding
Een nieuwe zet

Cast

Main characters 

 Derek de Lint – Eric Hoogland
 Petra Laseur – Nicolle Lebbink
 Liz Snoijink – Lucy Verhulst – van Delden
 Dolf de Vries – Oscar Verhulst
 Hidde Schols – Gieltje Verhulst
 Manon Alving – Betsie Groen
 Rudi Falkenhagen – Henri Bolleman
 Jules Hamel – Roel Smits
 Pim Vosmaer – Peter de Koning
 Hans Veerman – Bert de Vos

References 

1980s Dutch television series